Down the Line may refer to:

 riding down the line of swell/wave in surfing  
 Down-The-Line, a shooting sport
 "Down the Line" (José González song), a song by José González
 "Down the Line" a 1982 song by Mi-Sex
 Down the Line (radio series), a British radio comedy series
 Down the Line: Rarities, a 2009 compilation album of American singer–songwriter Buddy Holly
 "Go Go Go (Down the Line)", a 1956 song written by Roy Orbison
 The first name of the group that became Zoot (band)

See also